'Constantin Jude (1934 – 3 June 2005) was a Romanian professional handball player and manager. He is the longest-tenured coach in the history of Politehnica Timișoara (1961–1990, 1995–1997).

Other honours followed his death: he is the namesake of the multi-purpose, 2,200-seat Constantin Jude Sports Hall in Timișoara.

Achievements

Player  
Știința Timișoara (men's)
Liga Națională: 
Winner: 1956

Manager  
Știința Timișoara (women's)
Liga Națională: 
Silver Medalist: 1961
Bronze Medalist: 1960

Politehnica Timișoara (men's)
Liga Națională: 
Silver Medalist: 1979

Cupa României:
Winner: 1986
Finalist: 198*, 198*

References

 
  
1934 births 
2005 deaths 
Romanian male handball players
Romanian handball coaches